Triumph and Demise: The broken promise of a Labor generation is a 2014 book which chronicles the rise and fall of the Australian Labor Party governments of Kevin Rudd and Julia Gillard (2007-2013) by the Australian author and journalist Paul Kelly.

The author
Paul John Kelly is an Australian political journalist and historian and a commentator on radio and television. He is the current Editor-at-Large of The Australian newspaper, where he writes on Australian politics, public policy and international affairs. Paul appears as a commentator on Sky News and is the author of seven books: The Unmaking of Gough (1976), The Hawke Ascendancy (1984), The End of Certainty (1992), November 1975 (1995), Paradise Divided (2000), 100 Years: The Australian Story (2001) and The March of Patriots (2009).

The book
Triumph and Demise was launched by the Australian Prime Minister Tony Abbott in Canberra in 2014. It chronicles the six years of the Rudd-Gillard Labor governments, including the Liberal opposition of the period. The author conducted interviews with more than 60 of the key players of the Rudd-Gillard era, and explores the tensions at the heart of the strained relationships between the central personalities at the heart of the Labor governments.

ABC TV's Tony Jones described the book as looking at the achievements and the failures of the Rudd and Gillard governments and of "a malaise that's making it near impossible for governments to do their jobs properly and implement effective reform" in Australia. Kelly told Jones that the story of Rudd and Gillard was unprecedented: "We've never seen this before. We have never seen an event like this before. Kevin Rudd was a hero in 2007. He campaigned brilliantly against John Howard. He won a great triumph for the Labor Party. It was assumed, it was assumed generally that Labor would have three terms in office - that seemed to be an expectation, a quite proper expectation - and then two and a half years later, Rudd was destroyed by his own party. [...] I argue in the book that this was the fatal move by Labor, that essentially what happened here was that Kevin Rudd's prime ministership was certainly destroyed, but Julia Gillard, the other candidate, the deputy, the successor to Kevin Rudd, was also crippled by the way she became Prime Minister. So essentially what happened that night was you had two events. There were two figures in this partnership, Rudd and Gillard; the partnership fell apart, but both those figures were fatally undermined on that night."

Related
 Rudd Government
 Gillard Government
 Abbott Government

References

2014 non-fiction books
Australian non-fiction books
Melbourne University Publishing books